The rivière du Petit Moulin (in English: Little River of the Mill) is a tributary of the south bank of the Tortue River South-West, which flows north-east to empty on the west bank of the Tortue river; the latter flows north and empties onto the south shore of the St. Lawrence River, east of the village of L'Islet-sur-Mer.

The Petit Moulin river flows exclusively in the municipality of L'Islet, in the L'Islet Regional County Municipality, in the administrative region of Chaudière-Appalaches, in Quebec, in Canada.

Geography 
The Petit Moulin river has its source east of Bras Saint-Nicolas, in the Saint-Eugène sector, of L'Islet.

The Petit Moulin river flows on the south bank of the Tortue River South-West.

Toponymy 
Formerly, when a river had a sawmill or a flour mill, French Canadian parishioners popularly designated this watercourse as the Rivière du Moulin. "The mill was usually erected in a place where the drop was more significant in order to be able to take advantage of the power of water to drive the turbines and where road access was favorable. In addition, in winter, the ice roads on the rivers allowed the transport of the cut logs to the sawmills. cartographers and surveyors have retained the popular appellation in official documents, especially geographic maps.

The toponym Rivière du Petit Moulin was formalized on December 5, 1968, at the Commission de toponymie du Québec.

See also 

 St. Lawrence River
 List of rivers of Quebec

References 

Rivers of Chaudière-Appalaches
L'Islet Regional County Municipality